Acadie Siding is a Canadian unincorporated community, located in Kent County, New Brunswick. The community is situated in southeastern New Brunswick, close to Rogersville. Acadie Siding is built around the intersection of Route 126 and Route 480.  Acadie Siding is a mostly Acadian community.

History

Notable people

Bordering communities
Rogersville, New Brunswick
Noinville, New Brunswick
Pineau, New Brunswick

See also
List of communities in New Brunswick

References

Acadian communities
Communities in Kent County, New Brunswick